Meer Moiseevich Akselrod, also Meyer Axelrod (1902–1970) (Russified form of the first name Mark) was a Belarusian painter best known for his watercolor paintings of Jewish life in the Russian Empire and the Soviet Union.

Life
Akselrod was born in Maladzyechna, Russian Empire. As a child, he survived a pogrom and moved to Russia during World War I. In the 1920s, he studied and then taught at the VKhUTEMAS School of Art. His work was barely known outside the former Soviet Union until his daughter, Elena Akselrod, published her father's biography and a representative collection of his works in Israel in 1993.

References

 Georgy Fedorov. Meer Akselrod, Moscow, Sovetskij khudozhnik, 1982, 134p.

External links 
 A web gallery of Akselrod's paintings

1902 births
1970 deaths
People from Maladzyechna
People from Vileysky Uyezd
Belarusian Jews
Belarusian artists
Jewish painters
Belarusian painters
Vkhutemas alumni
Academic staff of Vkhutemas
20th-century Belarusian painters
20th-century male artists
Belarusian male painters
20th-century Belarusian male artists
Male painters
Soviet painters